The Köhlbrand Bridge is a cable-stayed bridge in Hamburg, Germany, which connects the harbor area on the island of Wilhelmsburg between the Norderelbe and Süderelbe branches of the Elbe river with motorway 7 (exit Waltershof). It bridges the Süderelbe, here called Köhlbrand, before it unites with the Norderelbe again. The bridge was opened on 9 September 1974.

See also 
 List of bridges in Hamburg
 List of bridges in Germany

References

External links

 
 Video of the Köhlbrand Bridge Being Inspected by UAV/drone

Bridges in Hamburg
Cable-stayed bridges in Germany
Buildings and structures in Hamburg-Mitte
Transport in Hamburg
Bridges completed in 1974
Road bridges in Germany